This is a list of Swedish professional golfers with one or more professional tour wins or holding a PGA, LPGA, Ladies European Tour (LET) or European Tour card.

Updated as of 5 March 2023.

Male golfers

   
1 ''Career best position in the Official World Golf Rankings.

Female golfers

   
1 M.E. = LET major only. Women's British Open turned major on both tours 2001, The Evian turned major on both tours 2013.
2 Career best position in the Women's World Golf Rankings. Officially introduced in February 2006, hence not available for all players.

Participation in international team tournaments

Ryder Cup

Solheim Cup

Golf at the Summer Olympics

World Cup of Golf

Men

Women

Alfred Dunhill Cup

Seve Trophy & Hero Cup

Royal Trophy and EurAsia Cup

See also 
List of female golfers
List of male golfers
List of golfers with most European Tour wins
List of golfers with most PGA Tour wins
List of golfers with most LPGA Tour wins
List of men's major championships winning golfers
List of LPGA major championship winning golfers

Notes
Players eligible for Swedish nationality that have chosen to represent other countries (e.g. Jenny Lidbäck, Carl Suneson, Camilla Hedberg) are not included. Players that have switched their nationality (e.g. Caroline Westrup, Paul Nilbrink) are included if they represented Sweden at the time of their win or notable achievement.

References

External links

PGA Tour
European Tour
LPGA Tour
Ladies European Tour

List of professional golfers
Swedish professional golfers
Golfers